Animal Science Products v. Hebei Welcome Pharmaceuticals, 585 U.S. ___ (2018), was a case before the Supreme Court of the United States involving the interpretation of foreign law in US domestic courts. The case arose out of a controversy in which Hebei Welcome Pharmaceuticals (Hebei), a company incorporated under Chinese law, and its parent company North China Pharmaceutical Group was accused of price fixing in violation of the Sherman Antitrust Act by  Animal Science Products (ASP), which filed a class action against Hebei. Before the district court, Hebei claimed that Chinese law required them to price-fix, and this claim was supported by the Chinese Ministry of Commerce in written submissions to the court. The district court rejected this defense because, in the independent opinion of the judge, Chinese law did not actually impose this requirement; a jury subsequently awarded damages to ASP. On appeal, the Second Circuit Court of Appeals ruled that the district court erred by entering into an independent review of foreign law, and that it should have instead, for reasons of international comity, deferred to China's representation of its own law, provided that this representation was "reasonable". In a unanimous opinion, the Supreme Court reversed the ruling of the Second Circuit, finding that respectful consideration must be granted to a foreign government's statements, but not conclusive effect. The case marked the first occasion that the Chinese government appeared as an amicus curiae in oral argument before the US Supreme Court, and was the third time that any foreign government had done so.

References

External links
 

United States Supreme Court cases
United States Supreme Court cases of the Roberts Court
2018 in United States case law
China–United States economic relations
United States antitrust case law
Pharmacy in China
Conflict of laws case law